John Ferrour was the member of Parliament for Cricklade in 1399.

References 

Year of birth missing
English MPs 1399
Members of the Parliament of England (pre-1707) for Cricklade
Year of death missing